Rossano is a town and frazione in the province of Cosenza, Calabria, southern Italy.

Rossano may also refer to:

 Rossano Veneto, a town in the province of Vicenza, Veneto, Italy
 Rossano di Vaglio, a place in the province of Potenza, Basilicata, Italy
 Rossano Gospels, a 6th-century illuminated manuscript Gospel Book

People 
 Rossano (given name), an Italian male given name
  (1940–2011), Italian journalist
  (1946–2012), Italian physician
 Federigo Rossano (1835–1912), Italian painter
 Feliciano Rossano (born 1924), Uruguayan boxer
 Geoffrey Rossano (died 2021), American author and historian
 Giorgio Rossano (1939–2016), Italian footballer
  (1907–?), Italian magistrate
 Herval Rossano (1935–2007), Brazilian TV actor and director

See also 
 Rosano (disambiguation)
 Rossana (disambiguation)